This List covers the locomotives and railbuses of the Bavarian railways, excluding those of the Palatinate (Pfalz). The locomotives and railbuses of the Palatinate when it belonged to Bavaria are in the List of Palatine locomotives and railbuses.

Locomotives of the Bavarian Ludwigbahn (Bayerische Ludwigsbahn) 
see: Bavarian Ludwigsbahn

Locomotives of the Munich-Augsburg Railway Company (München-Augsburger Eisenbahn-Gesellschaft)

Locomotives of the Royal Bavarian State Railways

Designation of State Railway Locomotives

Names and numbers of locomotives 
In the beginning, locomotives of the Royal Bavarian State Railways were given names. The locomotive name was displayed in raised capital letters on a brass plate on the side of the boiler or, in the case of tank locomotives, on the side of the water tank.

Locomotives were given the names of both Bavarian and foreign places, rivers, lakes and mountains, the names of important people from art and science, as well as the names of literary and mythological figures. Even a few animal names were used.

Examples: BAVARIA, WÜRZBURG, ALTMÜHL, FUNTENSEE, WATZMANN, COPERNICUS, FAUST, ODYSSEUS, PANTHER

Locomotives with names were also given a so-called inventory number that was displayed in small figures on the chimney and on the rear wall of the tender or, in the case of tank engines, on the rear wall of the driver's cab.

Inventory numbers ran in sequence on new locomotives entering service, regardless of class or type. Names and inventory numbers of withdrawn locomotives were usually reallocated to newly delivered machines. The name plates were then re-used.

Example: The Class C IV PASING 113, built in 1889, received the name and inventory number of a Class A V mustered out that year.

Names and inventory numbers were used for the last time in 1892. The state railway then went over to railway or running numbers, whereby locomotives of the same class or type were reserved a specified sequential range of numbers. The assignment of number ranges did not follow any recognisable logic. The number plates were designed in the same way and displayed in the same places as the name plates.

Older classification scheme 
The older classification scheme introduced in 1847 divided the locomotives into five groups differentiated by capital letters:

 A – Locomotives with one driven axle
 B – Locomotives with two coupled axles
 C – Locomotives with three coupled axles
 D – Tank locomotives
 E – Locomotives with four coupled axles

Locomotive classes were indicated with Roman numerals after the letter; these numbers ran in the same sequence as the introduction of the locomotives classes into service. There was no distinction between locomotives used for different purposes.

Example: Bavarian B V, Bavarian D XI

Because there were only locomotives with one, two or three driven axles at the time when this classification system was introduced, they were given the letters A, B and C respectively. When tank engines were brought into service in 1871, the use of four coupled axles was still not conceivable, so tank locomotives were given the class letter D. However, when goods train locomotives with four coupled axles then appeared towards the end of the 19th century, they had, absurdly, to be given the designation E I.

The system was further expanded in 1896 on the appearance of locomotives with separate running gear:

 AA – Locomotives with Vorspannachse (Locomotives with a driven axle and a raisable 'dolly axle' (Hilfsachse) to assist starting)
 BB – Mallet locomotives, which have two separate sets of coupled driving gear

Examples: AA I, Bavarian BB II

To differentiate between two-cylinder (Zwillings-) and compound (Verbund-) locomotives in the case of Classes B XI and C IV the class designation was supplemented with:

 Zw for locomotives with two-cylinder driving gear
 Vbd (also Vb or Verb) for locomotives with compound driving gear

Examples: B XI Zw, C IV Vbd

These additional letters were not inscribed on the engines themselves.

Narrow gauge locomotives for the only narrow gauge line in the state railways which then existed fell outside the boundaries of this system. These were given the abbreviation LE (for Lokalbahn Eichstätt) and Roman numerals from I to V. In addition these locomotives also displayed inventory numbers.

Classification scheme of 1901 
Because of technical advances and the requirements of railway operations, this scheme was no longer able to cope, so a new system was introduced in 1901.

This consisted of several elements:

A leading capital letter indicated the locomotive class:

 S – Schnellzuglokomotive = express train locomotive
 P – Personenzuglokomotive = passenger train locomotive
 G – Güterzuglokomotive = goods train locomotive
 R – Rangierlokomotive = shunting locomotive
 M – Motorwagen = rail motor vehicle
 E – elektrischer Antrieb = electric locomotive (from 1913, precedes the locomotive class)

The locomotive class could be elaborated on with one or more additional letters:

 t – Tenderlokomotive = tank locomotive (not used for shunting engines)
 z – Zahnradlokomotive = cogwheel locomotive
 s – Schmalspurlokomotive = narrow gauge locomotive
 L – Lokalbahn = branch line

Then followed the ratio of the coupled axles to the total number of axles, separated by a forward slash e. g. 3/5.

To distinguish between superheated and wet steam locomotives of the same class, an "H" or an "N" was added at the end of the classification.

Examples:
 So a Class S 3/6 meant an express engine (Schnellzuglokomotive) with 3 coupled axles and 6 axles in total – i.e. 3 carrying axles.
 The Pt 2/5 N is a passenger train tank engine (Personenzugtenderlokomotive) with 2 coupled axles and a total of 5 axles – i.e. 3 carrying axles – using wet or saturated steam (Naßdampfausführung.)
 EP 3/5 meant an electric passenger train locomotive (Elektrische Personenzuglokomotive) with 3 driven axles and 5 axles in all – i.e. two carrying axles.

The new classification system was only applied to those locomotives newly entering service. So up to 1920 two different classification systems existed together. With the foundation of the Deutsche Reichsbahn, later the Deutsche Reichsbahn-Gesellschaft (DRG) the Bavarian classification system was abolished.

Steam locomotives

Locomotives of the early period for all types of train 

None of the locomotives were renumbered with a Deutsche Reichsbahn running number.

Passenger and express train locomotives

Goods train locomotives

Tank locomotives

Lokalbahn (branch line) locomotives

Narrow gauge locomotives 

All Bavarian narrow gauge locomotives were built for meter gauge.

Modification of Bavarian steam locomotives by the Deutsche Reichsbahn and Deutsche Bundesbahn 
Locomotives of two Bavarian classes underwent major modification by the Deutsche Reichsbahn and Deutsche Bundesbahn. Although the rebuilds took place decades after the end of the Royal Bavarian State Railways, these locomotives displayed unmistakable Bavarian features and were designated even in railway administrative documents with (unofficial) Bavarian class names.

Electric locomotives 

Some of the Class ES 1 (E 16) and EG 5 (E 91) locomotives ordered with Bavarian class designations and locomotive numbers may have been supplied with DRG numbers.

Railbuses

Locomotives of the Bavarian Eastern Railway Company (Bayerische Ostbahn) 
The classification scheme of the Bavarian Ostbahn was different from that of the state railway. The locomotives were also divided into five groups that were given capital letters.

 A – Locomotives with one driven axle
 B – Locomotives with two coupled axles and a carrying axle
 C – Locomotives with three coupled axles
 D – Tank locomotives
 E – Locomotives with two coupled axles, but no carrying axle

The Ostbahn did not differentiate between the individual classes with a special class number. Instead of that locomotives were numbered sequentially within a group. After nationalisation, the former Ostbahn locomotives were initially operated under their old numbers. Not until 1892 were they redesignated in accordance with the classification system of the state railway.

The initial use of names was soon given up again.

Former Ostbahn locomotives were fitted with stronger tyres by the Royal Bavarian State Railways, so that in later years they had wheel diameters of up to 40 mm greater. Class C III (Ostbahn) und D IV (Ostbahn) locomotives were included in DRG's preliminary steam locomotive renumbering plan of 1923 under the numbers 53 7834–53 7868 and 88 7021–88 7026, but they did not appear in the final numbering plan.

Literature 
 Wolfgang Valtin: Deutsches Lok-Archiv: Verzeichnis aller Lokomotiven und Triebwagen Band 1 – Numerierungssysteme, transpress, Berlin 1992, 
 Wolfgang Valtin: Deutsches Lok-Archiv: Verzeichnis aller Lokomotiven und Triebwagen Band 2 – Dampflokomotiven und Dampftriebwagen, transpress, Berlin 1992, 
 Wolfgang Valtin: Deutsches Lok-Archiv: Verzeichnis aller Lokomotiven und Triebwagen Band 3 – Elektro- und Dieselloks, Triebwagen, transpress, Berlin 1992, 
 Heinz Schnabel: Deutsches Lok-Archiv: Lokomotiven bayerischer Eisenbahnen transpress, Berlin 1992

See also 
History of rail transport in Germany
Royal Bavarian State Railways
Bavarian goods wagon classes
UIC classification

References

External links
 www.lokomotive-online.com/bayern.htm

Locomotives of Germany

Deutsche Reichsbahn-Gesellschaft locomotives
Locomotives
Railway locomotive-related lists
German railway-related lists
Royal Bavarian State Railways